Peter John Bennett (11 July 1926 – 4 July 2012) was an Olympian water polo player and Australian rules footballer who played with St Kilda in the Victorian Football League (VFL). Bennett was a full forward and topped St Kilda's goal kicking five times, with a best of 59 goals in 1950; however, he never fully recovered from a knee injury sustained in his debut match in 1944 and was among the best players in a poor team.

Having already declined a invitation to represent the Australian team in water polo at the 1948 Summer Olympics and claimed a gold medal in the sport at the 1950 British Empire Games in Auckland, in 1952 Bennett took a year off from football in order to take part in the 1952 Summer Olympics at Helsinki. After two more seasons at St Kilda he decided to retire from football to concentrate on water polo, and captained the Australian team at the 1956 Melbourne Olympics where they finished ninth. In 2012, he was inducted into the Water Polo Australia Hall of Fame.

He was educated at Wesley College and Melbourne High School. He served as a private in the Australian Army as a teenager during the Second World War. His wife Marjorie McQuade was an Olympic swimmer for Australia in the 1948 and 1952 games, and a triple gold medallist at the 1950 Empire Games.

References

External links
 
 

1926 births
2012 deaths
Australian rules footballers from Melbourne
St Kilda Football Club players
Australian male water polo players
People educated at Wesley College (Victoria)
People educated at Melbourne High School
Commonwealth Games gold medallists for Australia
Water polo players at the 1950 British Empire Games
Olympic water polo players of Australia
Water polo players at the 1952 Summer Olympics
Water polo players at the 1956 Summer Olympics
Australian Army personnel of World War II
Australian Army soldiers
Commonwealth Games competitors for Australia
People from Brighton, Victoria
Sportsmen from Victoria (Australia)
Military personnel from Melbourne
Collegians Football Club players
Melbourne High School Old Boys Football Club players